HMS Seagull was a  of the British Royal Navy. She was built at Chatham Dockyard from 1888–1891. She was converted to a minesweeper in 1908–1909 and continued these duties during the First World War. Seagull was sunk in a collision with a merchant ship on 30 September 1918.

Design and construction
The Sharpshooter-class was designed under the leadership of William Henry White, the Director of Naval Construction to be faster and more seaworthy than the preceding prototype torpedo gunboat,  and the three s, while carrying a heavier armament. As torpedo gunboats, they were intended to defend the fleet from attack by torpedo boats, while being capable of carrying out torpedo attacks themselves.

The Sharpshooters were larger than the preceding ships, with a raised forecastle to improve seakeeping. Two triple-expansion steam engines, fed by four locomotive boilers, drove two propeller shafts. The use of locomotive boilers was not a success, with the machinery being unreliable and unable to provide the expected power. The machinery actually delivered  giving a speed of  when forced and  giving  under natural draft.

The ship was armed with two 4.7 inch (120 mm) QF guns mounted fore and aft on the ships centreline, backed up by four 3-pounder (47 mm) guns (two in single mounts on the ship's beam and two in casemates forward). Five 14-inch torpedo tubes were fitted (one fixed in the ship's bow and two twin mounts), with three reload torpedoes carried. The ship had a crew of 91.

Seagull was laid down at Chatham Dockyard on 23 April 1888 and launched on 30 November 1889. She was completed in January 1891 at a cost of £56,922.

Service
In August 1894 Seagull took part in that year's Naval Manoeuvres, and in July 1896 again took part in the Manoeuvres. Seagull was subject to a major refit in 1897–1898, being fitted with Niclausse water-tube boilers in place of the ship's locomotive boilers. Seagull took part in an extensive series of successful trials to evaluate the new boilers, which resulted in further use of the Niclausse boiler by the Royal Navy.

Seagull was a tender at Portsmouth in 1906, and remained on that duty until 1908. In 1909 she was converted to a minesweeper, which involved removing the torpedo tubes.

On the outbreak of the First World War Seagull joined the newly established Grand Fleet. In August 1914, the minesweepers attached to the Grand Fleet, including Seagull were employed on carrying out daily sweeps of the Pentland Firth. In September 1914 Seagull was deployed to guard the Fleet anchorage at Loch Ewe. On 27 October, the battleship  struck a mine off Tory Island, north-west of Lough Swilly, and despite efforts to tow her to safety, sank later that day.

The old torpedo gunboats such as Seagull were not well suited to continual use in the rough waters around Scapa Flow, and in July 1915 Seagull and sister ship  were deployed to Harwich to sweep ahead of the Harwich Force when it went to sea.

On 15 February 1917 Seagull was east of Aldeburgh when a periscope, probably of the German submarine [[SM UC-1|UC-1]], was spotted. Seagull dropped two depth charges on the wake of the periscope.

On 30 September 1918 Seagull was sunk in a collision with the merchant ship SS Corribb'' in the Firth of Clyde.

Pennant numbers

Notes

References

Bibliography

 

Sharpshooter-class torpedo gunboats
Victorian-era gunboats of the United Kingdom
World War I minesweepers of the United Kingdom
Minesweepers of the Royal Navy
1889 ships
Ships built in Chatham